Floyd Charles Peters (May 21, 1936 – August 18, 2008) was an American football defensive tackle in the National Football League and went to three Pro Bowls during his 13-year career.  He played college football at San Francisco State University and was drafted in the eighth round of the 1958 NFL Draft.

Later, Peters was an assistant coach for various teams.  He was defensive coordinator of the Minnesota Vikings from 1986 to 1990 where his defenses ranked number 1 in the NFL in '88 and '89 (71 sacks in '89, one short of an NFL record), and of the Tampa Bay Buccaneers from 1991 to 1994. During this time his nickname was 'Sgt. Rock.' He was also well known in Tampa Bay for wearing bright orange pants to practice.

Peters has four sons (Craig, Allen, Dean and Kelly) and a wife, Nancy.

External links

1936 births
2008 deaths
Sportspeople from Council Bluffs, Iowa
Players of American football from Iowa
American football defensive tackles
San Francisco State Gators football players
Baltimore Colts players
Cleveland Browns players
Detroit Lions players
Philadelphia Eagles players
Washington Redskins players
Eastern Conference Pro Bowl players
Coaches of American football from Iowa
New York Giants coaches
National Football League defensive coordinators
San Francisco 49ers coaches
Detroit Lions coaches
St. Louis Cardinals (football) coaches
Minnesota Vikings coaches
Oakland Raiders coaches
Tampa Bay Buccaneers coaches